Alchemilla glabricaulis is a species of flowering plant belonging to the family Rosaceae.

Its native range is Europe and Temperate Asia.

References

glabricaulis